"Jonathan David" is a song by Scottish indie pop band Belle and Sebastian. The song gets its name from the biblical duo of Jonathan and David, while B-side "The Loneliness of a Middle Distance Runner" is a reference to Alan Sillitoe's short story "The Loneliness of the Long Distance Runner." The front cover features band members Mick Cooke and Bobby Kildea with Gill Dodds. All three tracks from the single were later collected on the Push Barman to Open Old Wounds compilation. The title track was the band's first single to feature lead vocals from guitarist Stevie Jackson.

Upon its release on 18 June 2001, the single reached number nine in Canada, number 31 in the United Kingdom, and number 46 in Sweden.

Reception
Online magazine PopMatters said the song "isn't just guitarist Stevie Jackson's most triumphant non-album contribution to the Belle and Sebastian canon, it might be the best example of what his songwriting is capable of. [It] impeccably blends in with his band's MO, with its dense '70s-ish melody and pitch-perfect orchestration. Thematically, it fits with Belle and Sebastian's underdog narrative too."

Track listings
CD and 12-inch EP
 "Jonathan David"
 "Take Your Carriage Clock and Shove It"
 "The Loneliness of a Middle Distance Runner"

7-inch single
A. "Jonathan David"
B. "The Loneliness of a Middle Distance Runner"

Charts

Weekly charts

Year-end charts

Release history

References

External links
 "Jonathan David" at belleandsebastian.com
 "Jonathan David" at jeepster.co.uk

Belle and Sebastian songs
2001 singles
2001 songs
Jeepster Records singles